The tropical conger (Ariosoma scheelei), also known as the Scheele's conger, is an eel in the family Congridae (conger/garden eels). It was described by Pehr Hugo Strömman in 1896, originally under the genus Leptocephalus. It is a tropical, marine eel which is known from the Indo-Pacific, including Natal and Mozambique. It inhabits reefs in lagoons, and is known to dwell at a depth of 9 metres.

Named in honor of Capt. George von Schéele, seaman and amateur naturalist, who collected type specimen.

References

Ariosoma
Taxa named by Pehr Hugo Strömman
Fish described in 1896